This is the order of battle during the battles around Convoy ONS 5 from 29 April to 6 May 1943.

Ships in the convoy

Axis forces

References

Clay Blair: Hitler's U-Boat War The Hunted 1942–1945 (1998). 
Michael Gannon: Black May (1998).   
Peter Gretton: Convoy Escort Commander (1964). ISBN (none)
Arnold Hague: The Allied Convoy System 1939–1945 (2000).  (Canada),  (UK).
Paul Kemp: U-Boats Destroyed (1997). 
Axel Neistle: German U-Boat Losses during World War II (1998). 
Jürgen Rohwer & Gerhard Hümmelchen Chronology of the War at Sea 1939–1945 2nd Edition (1992) 
Stephen Roskill: The War at Sea 1939–1945   Vol II (1956). ISBN (none)
J.C. Taylor: German Warships of World War II (1966). ISBN (none) 
Dan van  der Vat: The Atlantic Campaign (1988).

External links
ONS 5 at convoyweb
http://uboat.net/ops/convoys/convoys.php?convoy=ONS-5

Notes

World War II orders of battle
ONS05